Mrikanda is a son of Vidhta, folk hero of the Bhargava Brahmins, a caste of Indian Priest. According to the legend, his Bhargava Brahmins community

In mythology and history 
Mrikanda was the descendant of one of the daughters of Daksha (son of the Hindu god Brahma), who married rishi Bhrigu and bore him two sons. Mrikanda (the elder of the two sons) had a son, the renowned sage Markandeya.

Mrikanda is venerated as the founder of weaving, and as a result of the gods' gratitude he was granted two boons—a tiger and a giant. The giant disobeyed Mrikandaʻs orders and was summarily slain, but the tiger was obedient and so lived. According to modern Koshte folklore if a tiger is encountered in the jungle it is enough only to speak Mrikanda's name allowed to prevent being attacked. Mrikanda is still seen as a watchful and protective figure in mythology.

In addition to being the father of modern weaving, he is also venerated as the biological ancestor of the great sage Markandeya, the rishi (sage) who is featured extensively in the Markandeya Purana (meditations on ancient myth, legend, and lore). According to the legends, Mrikanda and his wife Marudmati worshipped Shiva and sought from him the boon of begetting a son. As a result, he was given the choice of either a righteous son, but with a short life on earth or a child of low intelligence but with a long life. Mrikanda chose the former, and was blessed with Markandeya, an exemplary son, who was nevertheless destined to die at the age of 16.

Sources 

Characters in Hindu mythology